Achnagarron is a small village in the Scottish council area of Highland.

References

Populated places in Ross and Cromarty